Adria Arjona Torres (born April 25, 1992) is an American actress. She played Dorothy Gale in the Oz book adaptation Emerald City (2017), Anathema Device in the TV adaptation of Good Omens (2019), and Bix Caleen in Andor (2022). She has had supporting roles in the films Pacific Rim Uprising (2018), Life of the Party (2018), Triple Frontier (2019), 6 Underground (2019) and Morbius (2022).

Early life 
Arjona was born in San Juan, Puerto Rico, and lived in Mexico City until she was twelve. Her mother, Leslie Torres, is Puerto Rican, and her father, Ricardo Arjona, is a Guatemalan singer-songwriter. When she was a child, her father took her along on his tours, and she traveled often. At age 12, she moved to Miami and lived there until she was 18, when she moved to New York City on her own. There she worked as a waitress and hostess while studying acting at the Lee Strasberg Theatre and Film Institute.

Career 
Arjona's early TV roles include Emily in season two of the anthology television series True Detective (2015) and Dani Silva in two episodes of the television series Person of Interest (in 2014 and 2015). She later starred in Emerald City as Dorothy Gale and played Anathema Device in the mini-series Good Omens.

She appeared as a minor character in the film Triple Frontier, released in March 2019, and later in a starring role in the movie 6 Underground, released in December 2019.

In 2021 she starred in Netflix's Sweet Girl alongside Jason Momoa.

In December 2018, she entered negotiations in the Sony spinoff Morbius to portray the film's female lead Martine Bancroft; her involvement was confirmed at the end of January.

In 2020, she starred in the advertising campaign for Giorgio Armani's fragrance My Way.

In April 2021, Arjona was confirmed as the lead with Andy Garcia in the Warner Bros. remake of Father of the Bride. The latest take is told through the relationships in a sprawling Cuban American family.

In August 2020, Variety confirmed that Arjona had been cast in the Star Wars series Andor on Disney+. She joined previously announced series lead Diego Luna, who reprises his role from the 2016 film Rogue One: A Star Wars Story.

Upcoming projects 
In October 2021, Arjona was set to star in and executive-produce the drama film Los Frikis, written and directed by Tyler Nilson and Michael Schwartz. She will also star in Pussy Island, the directorial debut of Zoë Kravitz.

Filmography

Film

Television

Video games

References

External links 

 

1992 births
Living people
Actresses from Mexico City
Actresses from Miami
Actresses from New York City
Actresses from San Juan, Puerto Rico
American people of Guatemalan descent
American people of Spanish descent
Lee Strasberg Theatre and Film Institute alumni
Puerto Rican film actresses
Puerto Rican television actresses
21st-century American actresses